Orhan Kemal Cengiz is a Turkish lawyer, journalist and human rights activist.

He graduated in law from the University of Ankara in 1993. From 1997 to 1998 he worked in London. He is president and founding member of the Human Rights Agenda Association. He is also a founding member and general secretary of the Civil Society Development Center.

He writes for Today’s Zaman and Radikal. After threats were made to his life in 2008 for his work on the Malatya Bible murder case, he asked for and eventually received a bodyguard. His request was supported by Amnesty International.

In February 2016 he was a speaker at the Geneva Summit for Human Rights and Democracy.

References

External links
 Human Rights Agenda Association
  What we need is a separatist party, 20 October 2011
 Orhan Kemal Cengiz on GenevaSummit.org

Living people
Turkish human rights activists
20th-century Turkish journalists
Radikal (newspaper) people
Ankara University Faculty of Law alumni
Zaman (newspaper) people
Year of birth missing (living people)